Seol (also spelled as Sul or Sol) is a Korean family name, spelled 설 in hangul and 薛 or 偰 in hanja.

People who have this name include

 Seol Sa (Won Hyo) (617 – 686), Silla Dynasty monk
 Seol Chong (650 – 730), Silla Dynasty scholar
 Sol Kyung-gu (born 1968), South Korean actor
 Seol Ki-hyeon (born 1979), South Korean football player
 Seol In-ah (born 1996), South Korean actress

Lineages
The Korean family name Seol can be written with either of two homophonous hanja. Each of those three are broken down into a number of clans, identified by their bon-gwan (clan hometown, not necessarily the actual residence of the clan members), which indicate different lineages.

More common (薛)
 (맑은대쑥 설 malgeundaessuk seol) is more common of the two names.

Less common (偰)
  (맑을 설 malgeul seol) is less common of the two Seol names.

Korean-language surnames